The Fokker F.I (company designation V.5) was a prototype German fighter triplane design by Reinhold Platz of World War I. It was an improved version of the V.4 prototype triplane. For many decades, the V.5 was misidentified as the V.4.

About the only noticeable difference between the F.I's overall appearance and the later production Fokker Dr.I examples was a subtle convex curve on the outlines of the tailplane's otherwise "diagonal" leading edge planform, leading into the aerodynamic balancing surface at the end of each elevator tip.

Idflieg designated the first three V.5 aircraft F.I, but all subsequent triplanes were designated Dr.I. Werner Voss was shot down while flying F.I 103/17. Manfred von Richthofen flew F.I 102/17 in September 1917, scoring his 60th victory in the aircraft on the 7th of that month. Von Richthofen then went back to flying his Albatros D.V. Kurt Wolff was shot down in F.I 102/17 on 15 September 1917. F.I 101/17 was tested to destruction in August 1918, failing at a load factor of 7.75.

References

Bibliography

1910s German fighter aircraft
F 01 (1917)
Triplanes
Single-engined tractor aircraft
Rotary-engined aircraft